The Honda NM4 is a feet forwards motorcycle introduced by Honda for sale in the United States in June, 2014.  Internal documents, such as the service manual, refer to it as NC700J or NC700JD.  The motorcycle is also on sale in Asia and Europe.

The NM4 was shown under the name "NM4 Vultus" as a concept motorcycle at the March, 2014 Osaka Motorcycle Show and Tokyo Motor Show. In April, Honda dropped the "Vultus" name and announced the motorcycle would go sale in June of the same year. The production bike for the US is to have a 670 cc engine, unlike the show bike's 745 cc.

Design
It has a feet forwards design compared to the motorcycle in the anime Akira.  Styling was provocative; critics described it as "front massive", as a "scootercycle hybrid" similar to Honda's DN-01, a "mashup", and one said "it isn't pretty".

The engine and dual clutch transmission were sourced from the production NC700 motorcycle/NC700D "Integra" scooter. The concept NM4-02 variant had panniers; the NM4-01 had none. The production NM4 will have 16 liter panniers.   The Honda website says the model is a "limited edition".

Specifications

Specifications in the adjacent box are from Top Speed.

References

Notes

Sources

External links

NM4
Feet forwards motorcycles
Motorcycles introduced in 2014